Bartell is a compilation album by American electronic band The Moog Cookbook, released in 2005. It consists of material previously released as single b-sides and on EPs, soundtracks and compilation albums, as well as previously unreleased material.

The album marks the first commercial release of the band's cover of Foo Fighters' "Big Me," which had been featured in the music video for "Monkey Wrench."

Track listing

CD: MC-1205-01

Personnel

Musicians 
Meco Eno
Uli Nomi

Production 
Arranged, recorded and produced by The Moog Cookbook
"Twist Barbie" and "Kelly Watch the Stars" arranged by Roger Manning
"20th Century Boy" and "Mon Coeur" arranged by Brian Kehew
"Pumpernickel's Dark Ride Theme" arranged by Manning/Kehew
Mastering by Steve Turnidge at Ultraviolet Studios

References

2005 compilation albums
The Moog Cookbook albums
Self-released albums
Covers albums